In photography, filmography and other visual arts, lead room, or sometimes nose room, is the space in front, and in the direction of, moving or stationary subjects. Well-composed shots leave space in the direction the subject is facing or moving. When the human eye scans a photograph for the first time it will expect to see a bit in front of the subject.

For example, moving objects such as cars require lead room. If extra space is allowed in front of a moving car, the viewer can see that it has someplace to go; without this visual padding, the car's progress will seem impeded.

See also

Headroom (photographic framing)
Rule of thirds

References

Photographic techniques
Rules of thumb
Composition in visual art